Marie Claveau, stage name Mademoiselle du Croisy (died September 1703) was a French stage actress.

Life
She was born in Sainte-Hermine. 

She married first in 1635 to Nicolas de Lécole, Lord of Saint-Maurice. After his death, she married Philibert Gassot, known as Du Croisy, at Poitiers on 29 July 1652. They had at least two daughters: Angélique (died aged nine) and the actor Marie-Angélique.

She joined Molière's company in 1659, where she gained her stage name Mademoiselle du Croisy (a stage-name also taken by her daughter).   Her poor acting and friction with other company members led to her departure from it in 1665. 

She died in Dourdan in 1703.

References

17th-century French actresses
French stage actresses
1703 deaths
People from Vendée